Off the Ledge is a 2009 American comedy genre film set at a New Year's Eve party in Hollywood Hills.

Cast
Justin Whalin
Brooke Mikey Anderson
Nathan Baesel
Maria Cina
Jenny Mollen
Anne Ramsay
Nectar Rose
Carlee Avers
Andrea De Oliveira
Yan Feldman
James Ferris
Zosia Mamet
Raymond O'Connor

External links

 Cordova Pictures - Production Company
 Myspace Movie Page
 Off The Ledge Australian Article
 Australian Bigpond/FilmInk Article on Off The Ledge

2009 films
2009 comedy-drama films
American comedy-drama films
2009 directorial debut films
2009 comedy films
2009 drama films
2000s English-language films
2000s American films